Chore Boy is a brand name for a coarse scouring pad made of steel wool, copper wool or non-metallic terry cloth and all-purpose sponges. It is ideal for cleaning BBQ grills, cookware, glassware, oven racks and stove burners.  During the first half of the 20th century, the product was marketed under the name Chore Girl.

Copper scrubbers
Chore Boy copper scrubbers are made of 99.997% pure copper.  Mineral oil is used to draw, spool, and unspool the copper wire. In addition, it helps to make the manufacturing process easier and protects the wire from scratches during use. These scrubbers are recommended for cleaning copper and aluminum cookware, broiler pans, barbecue grills, stove burners, and oven racks.

Stainless steel scouring pads
Chore Boy stainless steel scouring pads are recommended for cast iron, indoor and outdoor grills, workshop, and tools.

Golden Fleece scrubbing cloths
Chore Boy Golden Fleece scrubbing cloths are non-toxic and recommended for brushed stainless steel, cutting boards, oven racks, cooking utensils, pots and pans, trash containers, cast iron, and golf clubs.  You can also use them to clean vegetables. They are treated with an abrasive, some binder, and a colorant.

As drug paraphernalia
In the American drug-using community, especially in more urban areas, copper scouring pads are also used as a makeshift component in do-it-yourself crack cocaine pipes. Utilized in this context, a small wad of the copper wool (the steel variety will not suffice for this purpose) is inserted into the end of a short cylindrical glass tube (sometimes called a "straight shooter") and serves to function as a screen or a matrix by which the melting freebase can be thoroughly dispersed across a large surface area.

References

Cleaning product brands
Drug paraphernalia